Suzanne Schiffman (née Klochendler; 27 September 1929 – 6 June 2001) was a French screenwriter and director for numerous motion pictures. She often worked with François Truffaut. The 'script girl' Joelle, played by Nathalie Baye in Truffaut's Day for Night was based on Schiffman. It accurately portrayed her close collaboration with Truffaut and other directors.

Schiffman's Jewish mother was detained by the Gestapo during the war, but an order of nuns hid Schiffman and her sibling. She studied art history at the Sorbonne after the war. Schiffman worked closely with Jean-Luc Godard and Jacques Rivette in addition to Truffaut, latterly on the scripts of his films. She was nominated for an Academy Award for Best Original Screenplay for Day for Night and won a César Award for writing The Last Metro with Truffaut.

Death
Suzanne Schiffman died of cancer in 2001, a year after her husband's death. She is the mother of two sons, one of whom is cinematographer Guillaume Schiffman.

Filmography
 To oneiro tou Ikarou (2005) (writer) - directed by Costa Natsis
 Bolondok éneke (2003) (writer) - directed by Csaba Bereczky
 Tangos volés (2002) (screenplay) - directed by Eduardo de Gregorio
 Innocent (1999) (technical advisor) - directed by Costa Natsis
 Corps perdus (1990) (writer) - directed by Eduardo de Gregorio
 Femme de papier (1989) (TV) (writer, director) - directed by Suzanne Schiffman
 Le moine et la sorcière (1987) (scenario, director) - directed by Suzanne Schiffman
 Hurlevent (1985) (scenario, first assistant director) - directed by Jacques Rivette
 Flügel und Fesseln (1985) (additional writer) - directed by Helma Sanders-Brahms
 Rouge-gorge (1985) (scenario) - directed by Pierre Zucca
 L'amour par terre (1984) (scenario, first assistant director) - directed by Jacques Rivette
 The Man Who Loved Women (1983) (first story) - directed by Blake Edwards
 Vivement dimanche! (1983) (writer, assistant director) - directed by François Truffaut
 Merry-Go-Round (1981) (scenario) - directed by Jacques Rivette
 Le Pont du Nord (1981) (scenario, first assistant director) - directed by Jacques Rivette
 The Woman Next Door (1981) (original scenario, assistant director) - directed by François Truffaut
 The Last Metro (1980) (scenario, assistant director) - directed by François Truffaut
 L'amour en fuite (1979) (scenario, first assistant director) - directed by François Truffaut
 La chambre verte (1978) (assistant director) - directed by François Truffaut
 L'homme qui aimait les femmes (1977) (writer, first assistant director, actress) - directed by François Truffaut
 L'argent de poche (1976) (original scenario, first assistant director) - directed by François Truffaut
 The Story of Adèle H. (1975) (writer, assistant director) - directed by François Truffaut
 Out 1: Spectre (1974) (writer) - directed by Jacques Rivette
 Pleure pas la bouche pleine (1973) (writer, first assistant director) - directed by Pascal Thomas
 La nuit américaine (1973) (writer, assistant director) - directed by François Truffaut
 La société du spectacle (1973) (documentalist) - directed by Guy Debord
 Such a Gorgeous Kid Like Me (1972) (assistant director) - directed by François Truffaut
 Two English Girls (1971) (assistant director) - directed by François Truffaut
 Out 1 (1971) (scenario) - directed by Jacques Rivette and Suzanne Schiffman
 Le bateau sur l'herbe (1971) (writer) - directed by Gérard Brach
 Domicile conjugal (1970) (first assistant director) - directed by François Truffaut
 L'enfant sauvage (1970) (assistant director) - directed by François Truffaut
 Mississippi Mermaid (1969) (script supervisor) - directed by François Truffaut
 Stolen Kisses (1968) (script girl) - directed by François Truffaut
 Les Gauloises bleues (1968) (script supervisor) - directed by Michel Cournot
 Fahrenheit 451 (1966) (assistant to director) - directed by François Truffaut
 A Married Woman (1964) (script supervisor) - directed by Jean-Luc Godard
 Bande à part (1964) (script supervisor) - directed by Jean-Luc Godard
 La peau douce (1964) (script girl) - François Truffaut
 Contempt (1963) (script girl) - directed by Jean-Luc Godard
 Le petit soldat (1963) (script girl) - directed by Jean-Luc Godard
 Vivre sa vie (1962) (script girl) - directed by Jean-Luc Godard
 Jules et Jim (1962) (script supervisor) - directed by François Truffaut
 Une femme est une femme (1961) (script girl) - directed by Jean-Luc Godard
 Lola (1961) (script girl) - directed by Jacques Demy
 Tirez sur le pianiste (1960) (script girl) - directed by François Truffaut
 Paris nous appartient (1960) (dialogue coach) - directed by Jacques Rivette

References

External links

Obituary, independent.co.uk; accessed 29 April 2017.

1929 births
2001 deaths
French film directors
20th-century French Jews
Writers from Paris
University of Paris alumni
French women screenwriters
20th-century French screenwriters
Deaths from cancer in France
20th-century French women writers